The 2014–15 St. Francis Brooklyn Terriers women's basketball team represented St. Francis College during the 2014–15 NCAA Division I women's basketball season.  The Terrier's home games were played at the Generoso Pope Athletic Complex. The team has been a member of the Northeast Conference since 1988. St. Francis Brooklyn was coached by John  Thurston, who was in his third year at the helm of the Terriers.

The Terriers finished the regular season at 12–18 overall and 9–9 in conference play. They qualified for the 2015 NEC tournament with the 5th seed and went on to win the Tournament Championship, the first in program history. The Terriers became the first team in NEC history to win a tournament title with three straight road wins. With the win, the Terriers received the conferences automatic bid to the 2015 NCAA Division I women's basketball tournament. The Terriers lost to #1 seed Connecticut in the Albany Regional, 33–89.

In addition to their athletic achievements, the team placed second in the nation for grade point average (3.656 GPA). Among the players were starting point guard Katie Fox who finished with a perfect 4.0 and Sarah Benedetti (3.96 GPA) who earned the ECAC Division I Female Scholar-Athlete of the Year Award.

Roster

Schedule

|-
!colspan=9 style="background:#0038A8; border: 2px solid #CE1126;;color:#FFFFFF;"| Non-Conference Regular Season

|-
!colspan=9 style="background:#0038A8; border: 2px solid #CE1126;;color:#FFFFFF;"| Northeast Conference Regular Season

|-
!colspan=9 style="background:#0038A8; border: 2px solid #CE1126;;color:#FFFFFF;"| Northeast Conference tournament

|-
!colspan=9 style="background:#0038A8; border: 2px solid #CE1126;;color:#FFFFFF;"| NCAA Tournament

See also
2014–15 St. Francis Brooklyn Terriers men's basketball team

References

Saint Francis Brooklyn
St. Francis Brooklyn Terriers women's basketball seasons
Saint Francis Brooklyn Terriers women's basketball
Saint Francis Brooklyn Terriers women's basketball